"Back on the Road " is a single for R&B/funk band Earth, Wind & Fire that was written by Al McKay and the band's leader Maurice White.  Released from their studio album Faces, it was a moderate hit on the UK charts rising to no. 68.

Overview
"Back On the Road" was produced by Maurice White.
Guitarist Steve Lukather from Toto also featured on the song.

The b-side of the single was a song called Take It to The Sky. Take It to The Sky and Back On the Road also came upon EWF's 1980 album Faces.

Critical reception
Nelson George of Musician wrote "Among the album's other pleasures are..Steve Lukather's melodic rock guitar on Back on the Road.

Covers
Jazz drummer Billy Cobham covered the single's b-side Take It To The Sky on his 1982 album Observations & Reflections.

Chart positions

References

1980 singles
Earth, Wind & Fire songs
Songs written by Al McKay
Songs written by Maurice White
1980 songs
Columbia Records singles
Song recordings produced by Maurice White